Camden Property Trust is a publicly-traded real estate investment trust that invests in apartments in the United States. As of November 30, 2021, the company owned interests in 171 apartment communities containing 58,588 apartment homes in the United States.

The name of the company is derived from the last names of its founders, Richard J. Campo and D. Keith Oden.

The company is ranked 8th by Fortune on its list of the "Best Companies To Work For".

History
In 1981, Richard J. Campo and D. Keith Oden bought the failing Houston condominium business of their employer and reorganized it into a REIT.

In 1993, the company became a public company via an initial public offering.

In 1997, the company acquired Paragon Group, which owned 17,000 apartment units, in a $615 million transaction.

In 1998, the company acquired Oasis Residential for $542 million in stock and the assumption of $430 million in debt.

In 2005, the company acquired Summit Properties in a $1.1 billion transaction.

In 2011, the company acquired 8 properties in Texas for $261 million.

In 2012, the company purchased the 80% interest held by a joint venture partner in 12 communities for $99.5 million.

In 2016, the company sold its portfolio of properties in Nevada, which included 15 communities with 4,918 apartment units, for $630 million. The company also sold a 444-unit property in Tampa, Florida for $58 million.

In 2019, the company acquired four communities with 1,380 apartment homes, including properties in Houston and Raleigh, North Carolina.

References

External links

1981 establishments in Texas
Real estate companies established in 1981
Financial services companies established in 1981
Companies listed on the New York Stock Exchange
Real estate investment trusts of the United States
Companies based in Houston
1993 initial public offerings